Dvergsøya is an island in Kristiansand municipality in Agder county, Norway. The  island lies in the archipelago in the Kristiansandsfjorden to the southeast of the city of Kristiansand. The island is used as a recreational area and it has wharfs for visiting boats as well as toilet facilities. Dvergsøya is only accessible by boat.  Dvergsøya is best known as the island where the Norwegian Crown Prince Haakon Magnus and Crown Princess Mette-Marit spend their annual summer vacation with their children. However, the island's fairly dramatic history is less known.

History 
Dvergsøya was originally a smallholding under the mainland farm Dvergsnes.  The island was historically used for farming.

Witch 
Maren was a smallholders wife from Dvergsøya.  She was arrested on 20 April 1670 in connection with the sinking of a ship bound for Jutland.  There were several people involved in this case, all women.  One of Maren's "accomplices" explained in court what should have happened. They had flown through the air down to the ship.  There they met the devil, disguised as a priest.  It was Maren who ensured that the boat sank. Maren denied the story, and was therefore doomed to undergo torture.  Under torture, she confirmed the story and was the last witch in Norway to be sentenced to death and burned at the stake.  The sentence was executed on 9 September 1670.

Burglary, arson and murder 
More recently, in the 20th century, two wealthy men named Jebsen and Vogt from Kristiansand built country houses (villas) on Dvergsøya.  Jebsen's villa was the scene of an infamous crime. On the night of Easter Sunday in 1933 three men broke into Jebsen's villa and then set fire to it afterwards to hide the traces of the burglary.  Afterwards, one of the thieves and arsonists tried to break with the other two. As punishment, they killed him by drowning him in a basin and dump him in the Kristiansandsfjorden.  Today, the ruins of Jebsen’s villa are still visible.

World War II
The location of Dvergsøya at the entrance to the city of Kristiansand made the island interesting also in a military context. During   World War II the German occupants had an anti-aircraft battery to protect the city of Kristiansand.  The battery consisted of six fixed anti-aircraft cannons on the southwestern part of the island. Today, the foundations of the cannons are still visible.

Royal visits
Vogt sold his villa.  For many years, it was used as a vacation rental house.  Crown Princess Mette-Marit is originally from the nearby city of Kristiansand and her family enjoys spending their summer vacations at Vogt’s villa which they rent.  Vogt’s villa is designed by Arnstein Arneberg, the same architect that designed the royal residence at Skaugum.  In 2009, a rental contract was signed with the municipality of Kristiansand which owns it.  A protection fence in the recreational area caused a political debate, but was built in spite of the protests.

See also
List of islands of Norway

References 

Geography of Kristiansand
Islands of Agder
Royal residences in Norway